Animal is the debut studio album by American singer and songwriter Kesha. The album was released on January 1, 2010, through RCA Records and distributed through Sony Music Entertainment. Kesha worked on the album with a variety of record producers and songwriters such as Lukasz "Dr. Luke" Gottwald, Benny Blanco, David Gamson, Greg Kurstin, Max Martin and others. Kesha had been recording demos for several years when one eventually ended up in the hands of Samantha Cox, senior director of writer/publisher relations at BMI. Cox passed along the demo and it ended up in the hands of Gottwald, who decided to have Kesha perform on the song "Right Round" with American rapper Flo Rida. Within two months, the song became a hit in multiple countries around the world. The event led to Kesha being sought after by many major labels, and she eventually signed a multi-album deal with RCA Records.

Musically, Animal draws from the electropop genre, while incorporating elements of dance-pop in its production and beats. Lyrically, the majority of the album's songs are based on Kesha's past life experiences of love, heartbreak, boys, and having a good time. The album received mixed reviews from music critics. Some appreciated its fun, carefree nature, while others dismissed it as juvenile and said that it seemed insincere. The album attained chart success, debuting at number one on the Canadian Albums Chart, the Billboard 200 in the United States and the IFPI Greece Albums Chart, while charting within the top ten in seven other countries. In December 2018, Animal was certified 3× Platinum by the Recording Industry Association of America (RIAA) for sales of over 3 million copies in the United States and has since sold over 8 
million equivalent units worldwide as of 2017.

Four singles were released from the album. Its lead single, "Tik Tok", was released on August 7, 2009, and was a worldwide hit, reaching number one in eleven countries. It reached number one on the Billboard Hot 100 in the US and stayed at the top for nine consecutive weeks. The song sold 12.8 million digital copies worldwide in 2010, making it the best-selling single of the year; whereas 6.8 million of those downloads were sold in the United States alone, making it at the time the sixth best-selling song in digital history. It has since sold over 18 million copies worldwide as of August 2019, making it one of the best-selling digital singles worldwide of all time. The album's second, third and fourth singles ("Blah Blah Blah", "Your Love Is My Drug" and "Take It Off") all achieved similar success, reaching the top ten in multiple countries, including Australia, Canada and the United States. The album's commercial success led to its nomination for the Juno Award for Best International Album at the Juno Awards of 2011.

Background
Kesha had been recording demos for a few years, when one of her demos ended up in the hands of Samantha Cox, senior director of writer/publisher relations at BMI. Cox, who had worked with Kesha before, passed along the demos to a friend at BMI, who passed it to the manager of Lukasz Gottwald, known as Dr. Luke. At the age of eighteen, Kesha signed to Dr. Luke's label, Kemosabe Records, and his publishing company, Prescription Songs. Luke was busy with other projects at the time, and Kesha ultimately wound up signed to David Sonenberg's management company, DAS. While at DAS she worked with several top writers and producers, but rarely worked with or even spoke to Luke. DAS searched for a label deal for Kesha despite her still being in a signed contract with Luke. Kara DioGuardi, an artists and repertoire (A&R) representative for Warner, was also interested in signing Kesha but the deal never went through because of the outstanding contract with Luke. Shortly after, Kesha and DAS parted ways and Kesha wound up reunited with Luke.

At the end of 2008, Luke was working on a track with Flo Rida called "Right Round", and the two decided they needed a female hook. Luke decided to have Kesha perform on the song and within two months, it was a number one hit in multiple countries around the world. The event led to Kesha being sought after by many major labels, and she eventually signed a multi-album deal with RCA Records. Kesha explained that she chose to sign with the company due to how well she got along with RCA A&R executive Rani Hancock, explaining that "Rani doesn't ever try to censor me, [...] and I like being surrounded by strong, intelligent women."

Development and inspiration

Kesha had been working on Animal for seven years prior to its release, and had written over 200 songs for the album. The abundance of material extended it from its initially planned twelve tracks to fourteen. Kesha felt that the album had an empowering, carefree message for young women. "For girls, I think it's an empowering record, it's funny, it's cheeky," she said. "I think people need to have fun with whatever they're doing—makeup, their clothes, music, live shows—anything you don't need to take too seriously, don't take too seriously." When asked how the album related to her life, Kesha explained that the album was completely autobiographical. "I just write about what I live—literally, [...] I think there's a great pop song in anything and everything, any situation." She cites her songs "Stephen" and "Dinosaur" as examples of this. She explained: "it's about this guy I've been stalking since I was 15. I wrote the song when I was 16 with my mom, and I was like, "This song's so dope, I know it is". "Dinosaur" came "about [when] this old guy who was hitting on me, and his toupee was kind of falling off, and I was like, "Oh my God, you're so old, you're prehistoric, you're like a dinosaur. D-I-N-O-S-A-you are a dinosaur." Explaining the reasoning behind the title track being placed at the end of the album's track list, Kesha said:

Music and lyrics

Musically, Animal is of the dance-pop and electro-pop genres, while incorporating elements of electro in its production and beats. Kesha's vocals uses Auto-Tune and vocoders to alter her voice and includes samples. David Jeffries of AllMusic noted that the album lyrically revolves around avoiding reality with a preference for a "garbage chic" life, with lyrics such as "Maybe I need some rehab, or maybe just need some sleep" from the opening song "Your Love Is My Drug". Lyrically, the majority of the album's songs are based on Kesha's past life experiences of love, heartbreak, boys, and having a good time. "Your Love Is My Drug" is a dance song that is layered with a heavy electronic backdrop. Her vocals throughout the song have been described as a shouty sing-speak style. Musically, the song uses a simple, upbeat lyric line. On "Tik Tok" Kesha uses a spoken word rap style on the verses while the chorus is sung. According to her the lyrics are representative of herself, stating "it's about my life, it's 100 per cent me". "Take It Off" has been described as "a heavily Auto-Tuned reworking" of "There's a Place in France".

"Kiss n Tell"'s lyrics depict a tale of the ""slutty" ex of [Kesha] [who is] spreading his wild oats around the town". The writing of the song came about after Kesha discovered that her boyfriend was cheating on her with a famous pop starlet. "Kiss n Tell" is a dance-pop track that features standard elements of "party pop" music that is prominent on Animal. According to sheet music published at Musicnotes.com by Sony/ATV Music Publishing, "Kiss n Tell" is written in the time signature of common time, with a moderate beat rate of 144 beats per minute. The song is written in the key of E Major and Kesha's vocal range in the song spans from the note of G3 to the note of B4. "Stephen" is opened in "Kansas-style vocal harmonies" as Kesha sings about an unattainable lover depicting their story. "Blah Blah Blah" combines heavy use of Auto-Tune with drum machines while infusing hints of R&B. Lyrically, "Blah Blah Blah" depicts a woman who would rather have sex than listen to a man speak. "Dinosaur" features a whistle-synth infused backing while the lyrics describe the story of older men hitting on younger girls. "Party at a Rich Dude's House" is reminiscent of music from the 1980s which according to Jeffries could have appeared on the soundtrack to the 1982 film Fast Times at Ridgemont High. "Dancing with Tears in My Eyes" is an upbeat pop-rock ballad; one of a small minority of tracks to incorporate Guitars in the instrumental, as Kesha tried to exclude the style from the album. "Boots & Boys" is a "lusty" song reminiscent of INXS's "Suicide Blonde", but from a female point of view.

Release and promotion

RCA noticed Kesha's strong following on social media when negotiating her contract and thus relied on viral marketing to build a following for her debut single, "Tik Tok" offering it for free a month before releasing it for digital download. "Tik Tok" was released for digital download in August 2009 and reached number one on iTunes in New Zealand without radio airplay. Radio stations soon began expressing interest in the song, but RCA/Jive Label Group chairman/CEO Barry Weiss decided to delay its shipping to radio by a month, to October, to let the song continue to build viral support digitally and good word of mouth. While "Tik Tok"'s airplay was not stellar right out of the gates, it soon gained enough momentum to give RCA the go ahead to release Animal in January 2010. Finance executives had pushed for a Christmas release to capitalize on the usual strong sales during that time period, but Weiss thought that the album would be lost in the shuffle among the many other releases released at that time. Animal was released in Denmark, Italy and Philippines on New Year, January 1, 2010. It was released in North America and Spain four days later.

To promote the album, Kesha did several performances worldwide. Her first performance was on MTV Push, a program broadcast on MTV Networks worldwide. She made several television appearances across North America to promote the album: It's on with Alexa Chung, The Wendy Williams Show, Lopez Tonight, Late Night with Jimmy Fallon, The Tonight Show with Conan O'Brien, and The Ellen DeGeneres Show. "Blah Blah Blah" was performed on January 18, 2010, at MuchOnDemand. While in the United Kingdom, Kesha made two appearances on television to promote the album and "Blah Blah Blah". The first was on February 18, 2010, on Alan Carr: Chatty Man. It was followed by a performance on breakfast television show GMTV, on February 19. The song was also performed live on American Idol on March 17, 2010. She wore her trademark glitter eye make-up and bounced throughout the stage while her backup dancers were dressed as human TV sets showing intermittent images of the American flag, owls, and skulls. The performance was accompanied by 3OH!3.

Kesha performed "Your Love Is My Drug" and "Tik Tok" on Saturday Night Live on April 17, 2010. On May 29, 2010, Kesha performed "Your Love Is My Drug" alongside her previous single "Tik Tok" at the MTV Video Music Awards Japan. She performed a set for BBC Radio 1's Big Weekend. On August 13, 2010, Kesha performed "Take It Off" alongside earlier singles "Your Love Is My Drug" and "Tik Tok" on NBC's Today. In the performance she was seen wearing boots, fishnets, glitter shorts and a loose tank top. By the second verse, her dancers – dressed head to toe in black – started to appropriately undress to the music as the chorus starts revealing gold shirts and tank-tops. The performance featured smoke machines with Kesha playing notes on an electric keyboard while crawling on the floor. Her performance of "Backstabber" for the Bud Light Hotel Super Bowl event on February 5, 2011, was broadcast on February 9 on Jimmy Kimmel Live!

Singles
"Tik Tok" was released as the album's lead single commercially worldwide on August 7, 2009, through digital distribution. Upon its release the single generated mixed to generally positive reviews. Critics generally praised the lyrics and celebration of party lifestyle; the song's production was generally well received although some critics criticized the song for sounding irritating and being too similar to other tracks performed by the likes of Lady Gaga and Uffie. The song achieved commercial success by topping charts in eleven countries, as well as reaching the top 10 in many other countries. It reached number one on the Billboard Hot 100 and stayed at the top for nine consecutive weeks. "Tik Tok" had sold over 6 million downloads in the United States alone and 15 million worldwide, making it the second best-selling song in digital history. The song sold 12.8 million digital copies worldwide in 2010, making it the best selling single of the year, beating the previous year's song by more than three million downloads.

"Blah Blah Blah" was released as the second single from the album on February 2, 2010. It had charted before being released in the album's debut week in the United States due to strong digital download sales on par with "Tik Tok", which influenced RCA's decision to release it as the next single. The song also debuted and peaked in the top 10 in three other countries under similar circumstances, only improving upon its peak in Australia. The single was met with mixed reaction from music critics, some praised Kesha's unapologetic lyrics combined with an auto-tuned working hook, while others called it trashy. Although reviews were mainly positive, a common complaint amongst critics was the appearance of 3OH!3.

"Your Love Is My Drug" was released as the album's third single. The song generated generally positive reviews from music critics. Critics complimented the song for its strong hook, but had mixed reactions about the chorus. Kesha was praised for knowing her way around a "strong pop chorus", while others critics called it predictable and dull. It reached the top 10 in the United States, Canada, and Australia—peaking at number four, six and three—giving her her third consecutive top 10 hit in all regions. The single  reached the top ten in five countries.

"Take It Off" was released on July 13, 2010, as the album's fourth and final single. Upon its release the single generated mixed reviews from music critics. A common complaint amongst critics was the demonstration of overly processed vocals with the use of auto-tune. Other critics complimented the song for its carefree dance feel and its catchiness. Due to strong digital sales from the release of Animal, the song charted in the United States, the United Kingdom, and Canada before being announced as a single. After being released as a single the song reached the top ten in Canada, Australia and the United States. It has also reached the top twenty in Ireland, the United Kingdom and New Zealand.

Critical reception

Animal received generally mixed reviews from music critics upon its release. The album holds a score 54 out of 100 based on 18 critical reviews, according to the music review aggregator Metacritic. Ann Powers of the Los Angeles Times stated that Kesha was "offer[ing] a thoroughly fleshed-out character to embrace or despise," comparing her persona to "classic screwball blond[s]" such as Jean Harlow and Mae West, while praising her and Dr. Luke for "refashion[ing] the screwball heroine role to suit a new era of aggressive superficiality and libertine self-empowerment". Her conclusion about Kesha and the album was that "[h]er total commitment to the deliberately stupid script Animal provides makes [the album] work." Ailbhe Malone of NME gave Animal a mixed review but concluded that "[b]eneath the patina of skeezy Freshers'-Week-LOLZ lyrics ('got a water-bottle full of whiskey in my handbag')" it seems there "lies a talent." Andrew Burgess of musicOMH was impressed with Kesha, calling her an "auto-tuned talk-singing, gum-smacker" that may well be "a pop-genius, a gutter-glam Jonathan Swift." He described the album as "an infectiously good dance-pop album." Daniel Brockman of The Phoenix thought that the album was "a clear subversion of pop norms" with "effortless hooks".

Monica Herrera of Billboard commented that the prevalent use of Auto-Tune on Kesha's vocals made it difficult to tell if she could actually sing, citing the song "Take It Off" as an example of "how easily individuality can get lost in a sea of Auto-Tune". On the other hand, Herrera was impressed with the "choruses that stick with the listener for days." David Jeffries of AllMusic was not impressed with the album's ballads, calling them "completely unsatisfying." However, he noted "that with so many fun, 'Tik Tok'-type tracks, the album has plenty for both brats and the bratty at heart." James Reed of The Boston Globe believed that Kesha's "personality is completely missing from [the songs]," resulting in her sounding "vapid and faceless." Jonathan Keefe of Slant Magazine was extremely critical of the album and Kesha, saying that her attempts to sing and rap were "pitiful", describing her as "insincere" and "souless". Dave Simpson of The Guardian also questioned the honesty of her lyrics while comparing her unfavorably to Lady Gaga, Katy Perry, and Britney Spears.

Commercial performance

In the United States, Animal debuted at number one on the Billboard 200 on the week of January 23, 2010 with sales of 152,000 (setting a record for digital sales of a number one album, at 76%). With "Tik Tok" occupying the top spot on the Billboard Hot 100 at the same time, Kesha became the first act to achieve this feat since 2008 when Spirit and "Bleeding Love" by Leona Lewis simultaneously held the pole positions. At the end of 2010, the album peaked at number 20 on Billboard year-end chart. Animal  became the tenth best-selling album in the United States of 2010, selling 1.14 million copies that year. In December 2018, the album received a 3× Platinum certification by the Recording Industry Association of America (RIAA) for sales of 3 million units and has since sold 1.47 million pure copies in the country alone.

In Canada, the album debuted at number one on the Canadian Albums Chart with sales of 16,000, later going on to become the biggest-selling digital album in the country. On the Canadian album year-end chart the album peaked at number 12. In May 2011, the album was certified double platinum by the Canadian Recording Industry Association (CRIA) for shipment of 160,000 units. The album was released a month later in the United Kingdom and debuted at number eight on the UK Albums Chart with first week sales of 18,723.

In Australia, the album debuted at number four, where it stayed consecutively for two weeks before falling to the number five position. On the Australian 2010 year-end chart, the album peaked at number 11. The album has since been certified double platinum by the Australian Recording Industry Association (ARIA) for sales of 140,000 copies. Animal was released on January 11, 2010, in New Zealand and debuted and peaked at number six on RMNZ chart. The album was peaked at number 30 on New Zealand 2010 year-end chart. It has since been certified Gold by the Recording Industry Association of New Zealand (RMNZ) for sales of 7,500 units.

Track listing

Animal + Cannibal

Originally planned to only be a re-release of Animal, Cannibal was instead released both as a deluxe edition of Animal as well as a stand-alone EP. The EP has been classified as a follow up "nine-song companion" record to Animal. Cannibal was originally intended to contain anywhere between four and eight tracks with the outcome consisting of eight tracks and one previously heard song remixed, for a total of nine tracks.

Notes
  signifies a co-producer
  signifies an additional producer
  signifies a vocal producer
  signifies a remix producer

Personnel
Credits adapted from the liner notes of Animal.

 Matt Beckley – recording engineer (track 1)
 Benny Blanco – drums (tracks 1–2, 6, 10, 12), keyboards (1–2, 6, 10, 12), music programming (1–2, 6, 8, 10, 12), producer (1–2, 6, 8, 10, 12), recording engineer (2, 6, 8), instrumentation (8)
 Anita Marisa Boriboon – art direction, design
 Graham Bryce – background vocals (track 3)
 Joshua "Ammo" Coleman – drums (1, 7, 10), keyboards (1, 7, 10), music programming (1, 7, 10), producer (1, 7, 10)
 Emily De Groot – stylist
 Megan Dennis – production coordination (tracks 1, 3, 10, 12)
 Shelby Duncan – photography
 Eric Eylands – assistant recording engineer (track 4)
 Sarai Fiszel – make-up
 Sean Foreman – additional vocals (track 6)
 David Gamson – music programming, producer, recording engineer, additional instruments (tracks 5, 9)
 Chris Gehringer – mastering
 Serban Ghenea – audio mixing (All tracks)
 Erwin Gorostiza – creative director
 Aniela Gottwald – background vocals (track 3), assistant recording engineer (4)
 Lukasz "Doctor Luke" Gottwald – composer (tracks 2–4, 7, 10, 12), guitar (7), drums (1–4, 7, 10, 12), keyboards (1–4, 7, 10, 12), music programming (1–4, 7, 10, 12), producer (1–4, 7, 10, 12), engineer (10), executive producer, vocal editing, background vocals (3)
 Tatiana Gottwald – background vocals (track 3), assistant vocal editing (2)
 Rani Hancock – artists and repertoire
 John Hanes – engineer
 Sam Holland – recording engineer (tracks 2–4, 12)
 Jim Hynes – trumpet (track 9)
 Claude Kelly – background vocals (3)
 Greg Kurstin – keyboards, music programming, producer, recording engineer (track 14)
 Oliver Leiber – producer, recording engineer (track 5)
 Max Martin – keyboards (11), producer (4, 7, 11), recording engineer (11)
 Ramsell Martinez – hair stylist
 Marc Nelkin – composer (track 9)
 Miriam Nervo – background vocals, vocal producer (track 13)
 Olivia Nervo – background vocals, vocal producer (track 13)
 Tom Neville – instrumental arranger, music producer, recording engineer, instrumentation (track 13)
 Chris "Tek" O'Ryan – sound engineer
 The Pickleheadz – background vocals (track 3)
 Tim Roberts – mixing assistant
 Becky Scott – production coordination (tracks 1, 3, 10, 12)
 Kesha Sebert – vocals (tracks 1–2, 4–5, 7–12, 14, lead – 3, 6, 13), accordion (track 5), cowbell (11), whistle (11)
 Shellback – music programming (8), producer (8, 11), recording engineer (8, 11), instrumentation (8), whistle (11)
 Vanessa Silberman – music production assistant (track 2), production coordination (1, 3, 10, 12)
 Gary "G" Silver – production coordination (track 2)
 Andrew Snitzer – saxophone (track 9)
 Yasmin Than – stylist
 Seth Waldmann – recording engineer (track 4)
 Emily Wright – recording engineer (tracks 1–4, 8, 10, 12, Additional- 13), vocal editing (1–3, 7, 10, 12)

Charts

Weekly charts

Year-end charts

Decade-end charts

Certifications

Release history

Animal

Animal + Cannibal

References

External links
 Kesha Music, Kesha Animal, Kesha Singles

2010 debut albums
Albums produced by Benny Blanco
Albums produced by Dr. Luke
Albums produced by Greg Kurstin
Albums produced by Max Martin
Albums produced by Shellback (record producer)
Kesha albums
RCA Records albums
Sony Music albums
Albums recorded at Kingsize Soundlabs
Albums produced by Ammo (record producer)